Sheini is a village in Zabzugu-Tatale District in the Northern Region of Ghana. Sheini is located in eastern Ghana on the border with Togo.

Economy

Minerals 
Sheini has unexploited deposits of iron ore. Exploration processes supervised by the Minerals Commission of Ghana are still ongoing. When completed iron ore is expected to surpass Gold as a primary source of revenue generated from the mining industry. Other minerals aside iron are being discovered also in huge quantities as contained in the first phase of the exploration report submitted to the Government. A railway to the coast would be required to export these minerals overseas.

Transport

Railway station
In July 2007 contracts were made for the construction of a railway extension to this village.

See also 
 Iron ore in Africa
 Railway stations in Ghana – proposed
 Transport in Ghana

References

External links 
 Cardero Resource Corp - Sheini Hills Iron Ore

Populated places in the Northern Region (Ghana)